George Wilfred Jones (28 June 1895–1970) was an English footballer who played in the Football League for Everton, Middlesbrough, Southport and Wigan Borough.

References

1895 births
1970 deaths
English footballers
Association football forwards
English Football League players
Crook Town A.F.C. players
Everton F.C. players
Wigan Borough F.C. players
Middlesbrough F.C. players
Southport F.C. players
Yeovil Town F.C. players
Great Harwood F.C. players